The 2010–11 Miami Hurricanes men's basketball team represented the University of Miami during the 2010–11 NCAA Division I men's basketball season. The Hurricanes, led by 7th-year head coach Frank Haith, played their home games at the BankUnited Center and were members of the Atlantic Coast Conference. They finished the season 21–15 and 6–10 in ACC play to finish in ninth place. They defeated Virginia in the first round of the ACC Basketball tournament before falling to North Carolina in the quarterfinals. They were invited to the 2011 National Invitation Tournament where they defeated Florida Atlantic and Missouri State before falling in the quarterfinals to Alabama.

Previous season
The Hurricanes finished the 2009–10 season 20–13 overall, 4–12 in ACC play. They were not invited to either the NCAA tournament or the NIT.

Departures

Incoming transfers

2010 recruiting class

Roster

}

Schedule

|-
!colspan=12 style=| Regular season

|-
!colspan=12 style=| ACC tournament

|-
!colspan=12 style=| National Invitation Tournament

References

Miami
Miami Hurricanes men's basketball seasons